The 2007 NORCECA Beach Volleyball Circuit at Guatemala was held April 20–22, 2007 in Guatemala City, Guatemala. It was the second leg of the NORCECA Beach Volleyball Circuit 2007.

Women's competition

Men's competition

References
 NORCECA
 BV Database (Archived 2009-05-16)

Guatemala
Beach Volleyball
International volleyball competitions hosted by Guatemala